Suicide Squad is a fictional organization featured in DC Comics books. It is also the name of several other groups or things.

Arts 
 "Suicide Squad (Brooklyn Nine-Nine)", the sixth season finale of Brooklyn Nine-Nine
 Suicide Squad (1935 film), an American film directed by Raymond K. Johnson
 Suicide Squad (film), a 2016 American superhero film written and directed by David Ayer
 The Suicide Squad (film), a 2021 American superhero film written and directed by James Gunn 
 Suicide Squadron, the American title for the 1941 British film Dangerous Moonlight

Comics 
 Suicide Squad (Arrowverse), a fictional organization appearing in the Arrowverse television franchise
 "Suicide Squad" (Arrow episode), the name of an episode of Arrow
 Suicide Squad (film), a 2016 American film based on the DC Comics supervillain team
 Suicide Squad (soundtrack), the soundtrack album for the 2016 film
 The Suicide Squad (film), an American film based on the DC Comics supervillain team, standalone sequel to the 2016 film
 "Suicide Squad" (Frew), a 1952 comic book published in Australia by Frew

Politics 
 Suicide squad (New Zealand), 25 politicians appointed in 1950 to help abolish their own legislative council
 Suicide squad, the members of the former Queensland Legislative Council who voted for its abolition

Other 
 A nickname for certain members of the Guggenheim Aeronautical Laboratory
 Suicide Squad (hooligan firm), association football hooligan firm linked to Burnley F.C.